Enfield East was a constituency which returned one Member of Parliament (MP) to the House of Commons of the Parliament of the United Kingdom.  It was created for the 1950 general election and abolished for the February 1974 general election.

Boundaries
The Urban District of Enfield wards of Central, North East, and South East.

Members of Parliament

Elections

Elections in the 1950s

Elections in the 1960s

Elections in the 1970s

References

Parliamentary constituencies in London (historic)
Constituencies of the Parliament of the United Kingdom established in 1950
Constituencies of the Parliament of the United Kingdom disestablished in 1974
Politics of the London Borough of Enfield